The Sankarani River is a tributary of the Niger River. It forms part of the Ivory Coast-Guinea and Guinea–Mali borders.

In Mali, it flows into the Niger River upstream of Bamako near the village of Kourouba.  

Construction of the Sélingué Dam began in 1980, with the goal of supplying Bamako with electricity; it was inaugurated on 13 December 1982. It and the accompanying hydroelectric plant comprised the largest development project in Malian history up to that time. The plant has the capacity to produce 44.8 million kilowatt-hours of electricity.

The river banks support gallery forests, though the Selingue Dam's reservoir covered many of them. As of 2008, more than a thousand fishermen caught "between 400 and 1000 kg/day in peak season and 10 to 50 kg/day in low season (March to May)" in the section of the river between the dam and the junction with the Niger.

At the height of its power, from the 13th to 16th centuries CE, the capital of the ancient Mali Empire is believed to have been at Niani, on the banks of the Sankarani.

References

Rivers of Guinea
Rivers of Mali
Tributaries of the Niger River
International rivers of Africa
Rivers of Ivory Coast
Guinea–Ivory Coast border
Guinea–Mali border
Border rivers
Ramsar sites in Guinea